Hymenorchis javanica is an epiphytic orchid native to the Indonesian island Java and peninsular Malaysia. It was thought to be endemic to the island of Java, which is indicated by the specific epithet, but other populations have been found in Gunung Ulu Kali, Malaysia.

Description
It is mostly monopodial but lateral branching does occur occasionally. The inflorescences are short and unbranched. The flowers are small, white and have a green spot in the center of the labellum. The petals are very thin and translucent.

References 

Aeridinae

Flora of Peninsular Malaysia
Flora of Java
Orchids of Malaysia
Orchids of Indonesia
Epiphytic orchids